Fluoroamine is a chemical compound with formula NH2F.  It is analogous to monochloramine, but seldom studied.

The term fluoroamine usually refers to amines with fluorinated substituents, an example being perfluorotributylamine (N(C4F9)3) and perfluoromethyldiethylamine (C2F5)2(CF3)N.

References

External links
 WebBook page for NH2F
 Monofluoroamine (PubChem page at U.S. National Library of Medicine)

Fluorides
Nitrogen halides